Macrometopia montensis is a species of hoverfly in the family Syrphidae.

Distribution
Venezuela.

References

Eristalinae
Insects described in 1938
Diptera of South America
Taxa named by Frank Montgomery Hull